In Singapore, a co-curricular activity (CCA), previously known as an extracurricular activity (ECA), is a non-academic activity that all students must undertake as part of their education. 

Introduced by the Ministry of Education (MOE), CCAs are strongly encouraged at the primary and post-secondary level but compulsory at secondary level. 

Students can choose from 4 categories: clubs and societies, physical sports, uniformed groups, and visual and performing arts. They may also start their own activities with the school’s approval. Anyone offering enrichment activities to schools must be registered with the MOE. 

The idea behind extracurricular activity is to broaden the child's experience and encourage the development of civic and personal values.

Structure of the CCA programme
CCA choices vary widely from school to school, although schools at each education level are required to conform to national standards prescribed for that level. Co-curricular activities includes all those activities which needs mind, heart and hand coordination. Such activities include indoor or outdoor games, solving puzzles, collages, drawing, dancing, singing, mimicry, knitting, cooking and so on. The range of CCA choices available increases at each education level.

CCA is strongly encouraged in the primary and post-secondary education level. It is however compulsory in secondary education level.

In secondary schools, CCAs are treated more seriously. Students are required to pick at least one Core CCA to join at Secondary One. Belonging to a Core CCA is compulsory, and the students may choose a second CCA if they wish. If the student excels and achieves results in their CCA, 1 to 2 'O' Level points are removed from the examination aggregate (a lower aggregate indicates better marks) at the end of the fourth/fifth year. Although the marks are few, it is believed by many that they may make a difference when the students are considered for the most popular post-secondary educational institutions. For example, one minimum prerequisite for admission to the Raffles Institution at Year Five, via the 'O' Levels, is an already perfect score with the maximum of 4 points removed.

The activities available as CCA choices can be divided into 4 key categories:

 Clubs & Societies
 Physical Sports
 Uniformed Groups
 Visual & Performing Arts

Structure of typical CCAs

CCAs are held outside of curriculum hours and the activities partaken depend on the nature of the particular CCA. For example, uniformed groups do foot drills and team-building exercises.

Many alumni return to their alma mater after graduation to help impart what they have learned to their juniors. Some do so within a formal framework, such within the uniformed groups (where ex-cadets are appointed as cadet officers) or as part of the Voluntary Adult Leader scheme (for those above age 20). Others do so on a casual basis.

Competitions
Many CCA-related competitions are held in Singapore, creating a competitive environment which provide CCA groups an objective to work towards.

The Ministry of Education organises competitions for competitive sports at the zonal and national level, respectively the yearly Zonal and National Schools Competitions. MOE also organises the biennial Singapore Youth Festival (SYF) for the Aesthetics CCAs.

List of CCAs

Student associations
Prefectorial Board
Students' Council
The Peer Support Board
The Junior and Senior Leaders Board
The Civics Tutorial Council / Monitor / Class Leaders' Council
The House Committee
Technology Student Association (TSA)
National Education Ambassadors
Key Club
Student Congress
Environment Councillors
Choir

Sports and games

Aikido
Archery
Badminton
Basketball
Bowling
Canoe Polo
Climbing
Cricket
Cross country
Fencing
Flatwater canoe/kayak racing
Floorball
Football
Fun Go Kart Club (only offered in ITE CW)
Golf (only offered in some schools)
Gymnastics
Artistic gymnastics
Rhythmic gymnastics
Trampoline gymnastics
Hockey
Handball (played with a club)
Netball
Outdoor Adventure (usually in polytechnics)
Rugby
Sailing
Sepak Takraw
Shooting
Air pistol
Air rifle
Skipping
Softball
Sports Invention Club
Squash
Swimming
Table tennis
Taekwondo
Tchoukball
Tennis
Track and field
Ultimate (Frisbee)
Volleyball
Water polo
Wushu

Uniformed groups
Boys' Brigade
Girls' Brigade
Girl Guides Singapore (GG)
Brownies
Military Band
National Cadet Corps (Air) (NCC Air)
National Cadet Corps (Sea) (NCC Sea)
National Cadet Corps (Land) (NCC Land)
National Civil Defence Cadet Corps (NCDCC)
National Police Cadet Corps (Land) (NPCC Land)
Narional Police Cadet Corps (Sea) (NPCC Sea)
Red Cross Youth (RCY)
Singapore Scout Association (SSA)
St. John Ambulance Brigade (SJAB)

Performing arts
Angklung Ensemble
Bands
Brass Band
Concert Band
Display Band
Marching band
Military band
Symphonic Band
Wind band
Chinese orchestra
Chinese Drama
Choir
Dance Clubs
Chinese Dance
Indian Dance
International Dance
Malay Dance
Modern Dance
English Drama
Gamelan
General Music
Guitar Ensemble
Guzheng Ensemble
Handbell Ensemble
Harmonica and Keyboard Ensemble
Harp Ensemble
Indian Orchestra
Percussion Band
Piano Ensemble
Orchestra
String Ensemble
Violin
Note that Band may either count as a uniformed group or a performing arts group.

Clubs and societies

Advanced Mathematics Club
AVA Club (Audio and Visual Aid)
Art Club
Astronomy Club
Cabin Club (with Singapore Children's Society)
Comics Club
Chess Club
Chinese Cultural Club
Chinese Calligraphy Club
Computer Club
Culinary Club (One school only)
Debate Club
Drama Club
English Calligraphy Club
Entrepreneurship Club
Environment Club
First Aid Club
Future Problem Solving Programme
Game Designing Club
Gardening Club
Green Club
Guitar Club
Infocomm Club
Interact Club
Innovation Programme
Indian Cultural Society
Inventions Club
Research Programme
Robotics Club 
Language Club
Library Club
Mathematics Club
Media Club
Mind Sports Club
Multimedia Club
Outdoor Activities Club (OAC/ODAC)
Philatelic Club
Philosophy Club
Photography Club
Photoshop Club
Robotics Club
Science Club
Singapore Youth Flying Club (SYFC)
Scrabble Society
Tactics Club
Tamil Literary, Drama and Debate Society (TLDDS)
Video Animation Club
World Scholar's Cup (WSC)

In some schools, instead of separate clubs for Language, Debate and Drama (and even Culture), these domains are grouped under the heading of Language Debate and Drama Societies, an example of which is the English Literary Drama and Debate Society (ELDDS).

References

External links
MOE CCAB Homepage

Education in Singapore